Juan Manuel Cobelli (born February 27, 1988 in Funes) is an Argentine professional footballer who currently plays for Italian Serie D club ASD Marina di Ragusa.

Career
In April 2017, Cobelli joined Italian club Taranto F.C. 1927. After spells with Técnico Universitario and Gimnasia y Tiro, he returned to Italy in August 2019 to sign with ASD Marina di Ragusa.

Honours

Club
Deportes Iquique
 Copa Chile: 2010
 Primera B: 2010

References

External links
 
 Argentine Primera statistics at Fútbol XXI 
 
 

1988 births
Living people
Argentine footballers
Argentine expatriate footballers
Association football forwards
Newell's Old Boys footballers
Deportes Iquique footballers
Santiago Wanderers footballers
Chacarita Juniors footballers
Sud América players
C.D. Cuenca footballers
Club Deportivo Universidad César Vallejo footballers
PKNS F.C. players
Taranto F.C. 1927 players
C.D. Técnico Universitario footballers
Gimnasia y Tiro footballers
Primera B de Chile players
Uruguayan Primera División players
Ecuadorian Serie A players
Argentine Primera División players
Primera Nacional players
Torneo Federal A players
Peruvian Primera División players
Serie C players
Serie D players
Argentine expatriate sportspeople in Chile
Argentine expatriate sportspeople in Ecuador
Argentine expatriate sportspeople in Uruguay
Argentine expatriate sportspeople in Peru
Argentine expatriate sportspeople in Malaysia
Argentine expatriate sportspeople in Italy
Expatriate footballers in Chile
Expatriate footballers in Ecuador
Expatriate footballers in Uruguay
Expatriate footballers in Peru
Expatriate footballers in Malaysia
Expatriate footballers in Italy
Sportspeople from Santa Fe Province